The 1946 Pittsburgh Steelers season was the franchise's 14th season in the National Football League (NFL). The team finished the season with a record of 5–5–1. This season marked the first of two seasons played with Jock Sutherland as head coach.

Off Season Changes
When the 1945 season ended, Jock Sutherland returned from service in World War II and signed a head coaching contract with team owner Art Rooney, Sr. on December 29, 1945 in front of local reporters. Sutherland's fame as a college coach caused a great deal of excitement among Steelers fans and ticket sales for the 1946 season set records. 

Additionally, fan favorite Bill Dudley was set to return for his first full season since serving in World War II.  Dudley had only played in 4 games in 1945. By the end of the season, Dudley's play was so exceptional, he was named the NFL's Most Valuable Player.

Regular season

Schedule

Game summaries

Week 1 (Friday September 20, 1946): Chicago Cardinals 

at Forbes Field, Pittsburgh, Pennsylvania

 Game time: 
 Game weather: 
 Game attendance: 32,951
 Referee:

Scoring Drives:

 Pittsburgh – Seabright 8 pass from Dudley (Dudley kick)
 Pittsburgh – Compagno 1 run (Dudley kick)
 Chicago Cardinals – Goldberg 8 pass from Mallouf (Cuff kick)

Week 2 (Monday September 29, 1946): Washington Redskins  

at Griffith Stadium, Washington, DC

 Game time: 
 Game weather: 
 Game attendance: 33,620
 Referee:

Scoring Drives:

 Washington – Saenz 1 run (Poillon kick)
 Washington – Todd 23 pass from Baugh (Poillon kick)
 Pittsburgh – Jansante 17 pass from Clement (Dudley kick)
 Pittsburgh – Dudley 1 run (Dudley kick)

Week 3 (Sunday October 6, 1946): New York Giants  

at Forbes Field, Pittsburgh, Pennsylvania

 Game time: 
 Game weather: 
 Game attendance: 33,702
 Referee:

Scoring Drives:

 New York – Hapes 2 run (Strong kick)
 New York – Filchock 70 run (Strong kick)
 New York – FG Strong 23
 Pittsburgh – Garnaas 30 pass from Dudley (Dudley kick)
 Pittsburgh – Clement 2 run (Dudley kick)

Week 4 (Sunday October 13, 1946): Boston Yanks  

at Forbes Field, Pittsburgh, Pennsylvania

 Game time: 
 Game weather: 
 Game attendance: 34,297
 Referee:

Scoring Drives:

 Pittsburgh – Lach 1 run (kick blocked)
 Pittsburgh – Lach 5 run (Dudley kick)
 Pittsburgh – FG Dudley 34
 Boston – Scollard 6 fumble run (Scollard kick)

Week 5 (Sunday October 20, 1946): Green Bay Packers  

at East Stadium, Green Bay, Wisconsin

 Game time: 
 Game weather: 
 Game attendance: 22,588
 Referee:

Scoring Drives:

 Green Bay – FG Fritsch 38
 Pittsburgh – Dudley 31 run (Dudley kick)
 Green Bay – Luhn, 19 pass from Comp (Fritsch kick)
 Green Bay – Schlinkman 2 run (Fritsch kick)

Week 6 (Sunday October 27, 1946): Boston Yanks  

at Fenway Park, Boston, Massachusetts

 Game time: 
 Game weather: 
 Game attendance: 13,797
 Referee:

Scoring Drives:

 Pittsburgh – Condit 18 run (kick failed)
 Boston – Dimancheff 26 pass from Governali (Scollard kick)
 Pittsburgh – Dudley 23 lateral from Compagno (Dudley kick)
 Pittsburgh – R. Davis 29 fumble run (Dudley kick)
 Pittsburgh – Dudley – 80 pass from Condit (Condit kick)
 Pittsburgh – Dutton 38 run (kick failed)

Week 7 (Sunday November 3, 1946): Washington Redskins  

at Forbes Field, Pittsburgh, Pennsylvania

 Game time: 
 Game weather: 
 Game attendance: 36,995
 Referee:

Scoring Drives:

 Pittsburgh – Dudley 80 interception (Dudley kick)
 PIttsburgh – Lach 5 run (Dudley kick)
 Washington – Baugh 1 run (Poillon kick)

Week 8 (Sunday November 10, 1946): Detroit Lions  

at Briggs Stadium, Detroit, Michigan

 Game time: 
 Game weather: 
 Game attendance: 13,621
 Referee:

Scoring Drives:

 Detroit – FG Helms 35
 Detroit – DeCorrevont 72 pass from Ryan (DeShane kick)
 Pittsburgh – Dutton 12 run (Dudley kick)
 Detroit – Greene 88 pass from Ryan (DeShane kick)

Week 9 (Sunday November 17, 1946): Philadelphia Eagles  

at Forbes Field, Pittsburgh, Pennsylvania

 Game time: 
 Game weather: 
 Game attendance: 38,882
 Referee:

Scoring Drives:

 Philadelphia – Zimmerman 1 run (Zimmerman kick)
 Pittsburgh – Lach 1 run (Condit kick)
 Pittsburgh – FG Dudley 14

Week 10 (Sunday November 24, 1946): New York Giants  

at Polo Grounds, New York, New York

Scoring Drives:

 Game time: 
 Game weather: 
 Game attendance: 45,346
 Referee:

Scoring Drives:

 New York – Paschal 4 run (Strong kick)

Week 11 (Sunday December 1, 1946): Philadelphia Eagles  

at Shibe Park, Philadelphia, Pennsylvania

 Game time: 
 Game weather: 
 Game attendance: 29,943
 Referee:

Scoring Drives:

 Philadelphia – Pritchard 58 run (Lio kick)
 Philadelphia – FG Lio 15
 Pittsburgh – Lach 7 run (Dudley kick)

Standings

References

Pittsburgh Steelers seasons
Pittsburgh Steelers
Pitts